Escape from Alcatraz refers to events surrounding real or fictional escape attempts from a former prison on Alcatraz Island in San Francisco Bay.  It may specifically refer to:
 Escape from Alcatraz (book), 1963 non-fiction book by J. Campbell Bruce
 Escape from Alcatraz (film), 1979 film adaptation of the book, directed by Don Siegel and starring Clint Eastwood
 Escape from Alcatraz (album), 2003 album by rapper Rasco
 Escape from Alcatraz (triathlon), two triathlons held in the San Francisco Bay Area of California
 Alcatraz: Prison Escape, a 2001 computer video game
 Battle of Alcatraz, the result of an unsuccessful escape attempt which lasted from May 2 to 4, 1946
 June 1962 Alcatraz escape, possibly the only successful escape attempt from the prison

See also
 Alcatraz (disambiguation)
 List of Alcatraz escape attempts